The following are lists of changes to American television networks, including changes of station affiliations, that occurred in 2019.

Launches

Conversions and rebrandings

Closures

Station launches

Stations changing network affiliation

Major affiliation changes

 This section outlines affiliation changes involving English and Spanish language networks (ABC, NBC, CBS, Fox, PBS, The CW, Univision, etc.), and format conversions involving independent stations. Digital subchannels will only be mentioned if the prior or new affiliation involves a major English and Spanish broadcast network or a locally programmed independent entertainment format.

Subchannel affiliation

References

 
American television network changes